Matthew Putman is an American scientist, educator, musician and film & stage producer. He is best known for his work in nanotechnology, the science of working in dimensions smaller than 100 nanometers. Putman currently serves as the CEO of Nanotronics Imaging, an advanced machines and intelligence company that has redefined factory control through the invention of a platform that combines AI, automation, and sophisticated imaging to assist human ingenuity in detecting flaws in manufacturing. He recently built New York State’s first high-tech manufacturing hub, located in Building 20 of the Brooklyn Navy Yard.

Career 

After receiving a B.A. in Music and Theater from Baldwin-Wallace University in Ohio, Putman worked as Vice President of Development for Tech Pro, Inc., a business launched by his parents, Kay and John Putman, in 1982. He later received a PhD in Applied Mathematics and Physics, and served as a professor and researcher. 

Tech-Pro was acquired by Roper Industries in March 2008. That same year, John and Matthew Putman founded Nanotronics Imaging, which includes Peter Thiel as the 3rd director on the Board.

Putman has published over 30 papers and is an inventor on over 50 patent applications  filed in the U.S. and other countries for his work on manufacturing, automation, inspection, instrumentation, super resolution, and artificial intelligence. He is  an expert in quantum computing and a founding member of The Quantum Industry Coalition. His groundbreaking inventions in manufacturing include the development of the world’s most advanced inspection instrument, which combines  super resolution, AI, and robotics. He has lectured at the University of Paris, USC, University of Michigan, and The Technical University of São Paulo. 

Along with his scientific and engineering work, Matthew Putman has produced several plays and films. Putman is an Artist-in-Residence for Imagine Science Films, which seeks to build relationships between scientists and filmmakers. He most recently produced the critically acclaimed film, Son of Monarchs which premiered at Sundance in February 2021 and was awarded the Sloane Prize. also published a  book of poems, Magnificent Chaos, partly written during his battle with esophagal cancer in 2005 (AuthorHouse, 2011).

A jazz pianist and composer, he appears on the CDs Perennial (2008), Gowanus Recordings (577 Records, 2009), Telepathic Alliances (577 Records, 2017) and has played with jazz masters Ornette Coleman, Daniel Carter and Vijay Iyer. He has performed in several venues and festivals, including the  Forward Festival. His most recent jazz album was released  on in April 2021 with 577 records, featuring Michael Sarian.
He has also published a book of poems, Magnificent Chaos, partly written during his battle with esophagal cancer in 2005 (AuthorHouse, 2011).

Matthew Putman serves on the Board of Directors of Pioneer Works and New York Live Arts. He is an Artist-in-Residence for Imagine Science Films, which seeks to build relationships between scientists and filmmakers.

References

American nanotechnologists
American chief executives
American jazz musicians
Year of birth missing (living people)
Living people
Baldwin Wallace University alumni
Columbia School of Engineering and Applied Science alumni
American scientists
Nanotechnology
Jazz